Antje Schröder (born 2 September 1963) is a German female former track and field athlete who competed in the 800 metres. She holds a personal best of 1:57.57 minutes, set in Leipzig in 1983. That same year she was the silver medallist in the 1983 European Cup behind Jarmila Kratochvílová and was a finalist at the inaugural 1983 World Championships in Athletics.

She competed for SC Chemie Halle during her career and was the 800 m runner-up at both the indoor and outdoor national championships in 1983.

International competitions

References

External links

Living people
1963 births
East German female middle-distance runners
German female middle-distance runners
World Athletics Championships athletes for East Germany
SC Chemie Halle athletes